Aldo Maccione (born 27 November 1935) is a French-Italian film actor and singer who is a member of the Italian comedy rock band Brutos. He has appeared in more than 50 films since 1964. He was born in Turin, Italy.

Filmography

 La Grande maffia (1971)
 L'aventure, c'est l'aventure (1972)
 Now Where Did the 7th Company Get to? (1973)
 Ante Up (1974)
 Sex Pot (1975)
 Frankenstein - Italian Style (1975)
 Due cuori, una cappella (1975)
 Sex with a Smile II (1976)
 The Loves and Times of Scaramouche (1976)
 The Big Operator (1976)
 Carioca tigre (1976)
 Animal (1977)
 Taxi Girl (1977)
 The Virgo, the Taurus and the Capricorn (1977)
 Je suis timide mais je me soigne (1978)
 C'est pas moi, c'est lui (1980)
 I'm Photogenic (1980)
 A Policewoman in New York (1981)
 Tais-toi quand tu parles (1981)
 Prickly Pears (1981)
 Porca vacca (1982)
 Plus beau que moi, tu meurs (1982)
 Le bourreau des cœurs (1983)
 Pizzaiolo et Mozzarel (1985)
 Let's Not Keep in Touch (1993)
 The Chambermaid on the Titanic (1997)
 I Fetentoni (1999)
 The Legend of Al, John and Jack (2002)
 Travaux, on sait quand ça commence... (2005)

References

External links

1935 births
Living people
Italian male film actors
Actors from Turin
La Ferme Célébrités participants
Musicians from Turin